CFSG may refer to:

 The classification of finite simple groups, a mathematical theorem
China Fire and Security Group